Elisabeth Ebeling (15 October 1946 – 16 July 2020) was a German film and stage actress. In total, she played several hundred roles and was involved with famous directors, including Rainer Werner Fassbinder and Klaus Michael Grüber.

Ebeling died in Aachen on 16 July 2020, aged 73.

Filmography (selected)
 1989: 
 1996: Willi und die Windzors
 1996: Stolz
 1999: Der letzte Zeuge (1 Episode)
 1999: Für alle Fälle Stefanie (1 Episode)
 2003: 
 2006: Durst haben
 2007:

References

External links 
 

20th-century German actresses
21st-century German actresses
German actresses
German film actresses
German stage actresses
1946 births
2020 deaths
People from Hanover Region